Living Right or Livin' Right can refer to:

Livin' Right (album), the debut album by Steve Forde and the Flange
"Livin' Right", a song by Glenn Frey
"Living Right", a song by Lil Wayne featuring Wiz Khalifa, on Lil Wayne's album Free Weezy Album

See also
Right to an adequate standard of living
Right to life (disambiguation)